Austra Skujytė (born 12 August 1979 in Biržai) is a retired Lithuanian athlete, competing in both the heptathlon and the decathlon. On 15 April 2005 in Columbia, Missouri, she broke the women's decathlon world record, with a score of 8358.  She is the 2004 Olympic silver medalist and 2012 Olympic bronze medalist in the heptathlon. The later medal was allocated retrospectively following the disqualification in 2016 of original medalist Tatyana Chernova for historic doping offences.

Her personal best in the 7-event heptathlon of 6599 was set on 4 August at the 2012 Summer Olympics in London. She is an eight time national champion in the Shot Put. She has also won National Championships in the Discus, 100 metres hurdles twice and Long jump three times. She retired from athletics in 2017.

Skujytė graduated with a degree in kinesiology from Kansas State University, where she became the first woman at the school to win multiple NCAA championships, capturing titles in the heptathlon in 2001 and 2002. In 2002, she also took second in the NCAA in the shot put competition.

Achievements

References 

 

1979 births
Living people
People from Biržai
Kansas State Wildcats women's track and field athletes
Lithuanian female shot putters
Lithuanian heptathletes
Lithuanian decathletes
Athletes (track and field) at the 2000 Summer Olympics
Athletes (track and field) at the 2004 Summer Olympics
Athletes (track and field) at the 2008 Summer Olympics
Athletes (track and field) at the 2012 Summer Olympics
Olympic athletes of Lithuania
Olympic silver medalists for Lithuania
Medalists at the 2004 Summer Olympics
Olympic silver medalists in athletics (track and field)
Female decathletes
World Athletics record holders
Olympic bronze medalists for Lithuania